Armand Richard Vial (born September 28, 1954) is an American lawyer, farmer, small business owner, and Nonpartisan candidate for Oregon's State Senate District 18, which covers parts of Washington County, in the November 2022 midterm election. He previously served in the served in the Oregon House of Representatives in 2016 representing the 26th district. He has served in the state legislature as a Republican.

Biography
Vial was born in Lynwood, California. He attended Brigham Young University, from where he graduated in 1978, and the Willamette University College of Law. He has served on the Washington County Land Use Advisory Committee, and the Clean Water Services Advisory Committee.

He ran for the state House as a Republican in 2016. During his campaign, a complaint filed by Kathleen Stuart, the director of a state Democratic Party organization, alleged that Vial did not reside in the district he was campaigning to represent. The case was resolved in Vial's favor. He defeated Democratic candidate Ray Lister in the general election.

Vial is the former Chair of the Washington County Planning Commission and has previously served as Chair of the Groner School District Board and the Washington County Fair Board.

Vial was defeated in 2018 by Courtney Neron, a Democrat. After leaving the state legislature, Vial served as the Oregon Deputy Secretary of State under Bev Clarno from April 2019 to January 2020.

In 2020, Vial changed his political affiliation to Nonpartisan. In 2020, he announced his candidacy for Secretary of State, organizing a nominating convention to be held on July 25, but did not receive the signatures necessary to qualify.

In August of 2022, Vial qualified to run as the non-affiliated candidate for the Oregon State Senate District 18 in the November 8, 2022 General Election.

Personal life
Vial and his wife, Paula, who have been married since 1975, have 13 children, including 7 Vietnamese refugee children, and 46 grandchildren.

Vial and his family are members of the Church of Jesus Christ of Latter-day Saints and Vial has previously served as a Mormon Bishop.

References

External links
 Campaign website

Living people
Members of the Oregon House of Representatives
Oregon lawyers
People from Lynwood, California
People from Washington County, Oregon
21st-century American politicians
Brigham Young University alumni
Willamette University College of Law alumni
School board members in Oregon
1954 births
Latter Day Saints from Oregon
Oregon Republicans
Oregon Independents